Cambridge Semiconductor Limited (CamSemi) is a fabless semiconductor business based in Cambridge, England that was acquired by US-based competitor Power Integrations Inc., in January 2015.

The company specializes in power management integrated circuits and was spun out of Cambridge University in August 2000 with seed investment from the Cambridge University Challenge Fund, as a commercial venture arising out of the research conducted by Professors Gehan Amarantunga and Florin Udrea at the Cambridge University Engineering Department.

CamSemi is developing a range of new ICs for use in power conversion products such as mains power supplies and lighting. The company’s products are enabling power supply manufacturers to develop low cost products that comply with Energy Star, the European code of conduct and related energy-efficiency regulations. All CamSemi products are based on a proprietary portfolio of technologies and topologies including advanced control architectures, RDFC and PowerBrane.

The company’s venture capital investors included DFJ Esprit, Scottish Equity Partners and cleantech investors  The Carbon Trust and NES Partners.

Launched products
C2470 mixed signal controllers and RDFC (Resonant Discontinuous Forward Converter) topology for switched-mode power supplies (SMPS)
C2140, C2150, C2183 and C2283 primary side sensing (PSS) flyback controllers for SMPS
C2160 and C2170 PSS flyback controller families targeting 5 star-rated mobile phone chargers with <30 mW no-load
C5183 PSS flyback controller with active start-up for SMPS
C3120, C3183 and C3682 LED drivers ICs for solid-state lighting

Development milestones

2002	CamSemi secured series A funding led by 3i to raise $6.1 million.
2004	Announced PowerBrane, a new technology to integrate IGBTs and controllers onto the same die.
2007	Launched RDFC controller family  Company announcement.
Opened sales office and application design centre in Taiwan.
2008	Closed series C funding to raise $34 million; introduced first primary side sensing controllers  and named ‘Start up of the year’ by National Microelectronics Institute Company announcement
2009	Named as ‘University Spin-out of the Year’ in New Energy Awards  Company announcement
 Launched C2160 family of PSS controllers to help manufacturers develop power supplies with <30 mW no load power
2011	Awarded ‘Business Weekly’s East of England International Trade Award’  Company announcement
2012	Listed in 29th position in '2012 Sunday Times Hiscox Tech Track 100' report. Also Company announcement
2013	Awarded NMI 'Low Power Design Innovation' award for C2172 PSS controller with features to reduce no load power consumption. Also Company announcement

References

External links
 CamSemi

Fabless semiconductor companies
Companies based in Cambridge
3i Group companies
Semiconductor companies of the United Kingdom